Life Is Too Short may refer to:

Music
 Life Is...Too Short, an 1988 album by Too Short
 Life Is Too Short, a song by Modern Talking from their 2003 album Universe
 Life Is Too Short, a song by Scorpions from their 2001 album Acoustica

Television
 Life's Too Short (TV series), a BBC2 television observational comedy sitcom series

See also
Life's Too Short (disambiguation)